The Cork Person of the Year awards were founded in 1993 to recognise outstanding achievements by people from Cork. Each year 12 Cork persons of the month are chosen, although some months multiple people in the same area are selected. Then, in January of the following year the overall Cork person(s) of the year are selected from this group.

Previous Winners

References

Cork (city)